De World International Secondary School (DWISS) is located at KM16 Aba—Port Harcourt expressway in Port Harcourt, Rivers State. It is a  coeducational boarding high school offering classes from JSS1 to SS3. The school provides subjects in the areas of Chemistry, Physics, Biology, English language, Mathematics and Information Technology. Admissions are based on an entrance examination, an interview and an aptitude test.

Notable alumni
 Obinna Charles Okwelume, scholar, journalist and playwright.
 Tommy Usen-Emana Isang, Preacher, Pastor, Lecturer and Educationist.

References

External links

Schools in Port Harcourt
Secondary schools in Rivers State